Rainbowman or Rainbow man may refer to:

Music

People
Rainbowman, a member of The Hype (band), played by David Bowie

Albums
Rainbow Man, an album by Jeff Bates, 2003
Rainbow-Man, an album by Mitsuhiro Oikawa, 2008

Songs
"Rainbow man ", a single by The Fool (design collective), 1969
"Rainbow Man", a song by Michael Martin Murphey from Geronimo's Cadillac (album), 1972
"Rainbow Man", a song by The Settlers (band) from The New Sound of the Settlers, 1974
"Rainbow Man", a song by SBB (band) from Welcome, 1979
"Rainbow Man", a song by Earl Klugh from Soda Fountain Shuffle, 1985
"Rainbow Man", a song by The Pogues from Hell's Ditch, 1990
"Rainbow Man", a song by Rik Emmett from Ipso Facto (album), 1992
"Rainbow Man", a song by The Yellow Monkey from Sicks, 1997
"Rainbowman", a song by Beseech from ...From a Bleeding Heart, 1998
"Rainbow Man", a single by Busy P, 2007

Films
The Rainbow Man, directed by Fred C. Newmeyer, 1929
The Rainbow Man, also known as Nijiotoko, directed by Kiyohiko Ushihara, 1949

Characters
Warrior of Love Rainbowman, 1972–73 television series
Rainbow Man, an enemy of Greg Saunders

Other uses
Rollen Stewart, also known as "Rainbow Man"